Aliabad (also Romanized as ‘Alīābād) is a village in Darjazin Rural District, in the Central District of Mehdishahr County, Semnan Province, Iran. At the 2006 census, its population was 150, in 44 families.

References 

Populated places in Mehdishahr County